The 1920–21 Clarkson Golden Knights men's ice hockey season was the inaugural season of play for the program.

Season
With colleges in the United States now back in full swing after the end of World War I, the Thomas S. Clarkson Memorial College of Technology, or Clarkson for short, joined a growing list of schools who added ice hockey as a varsity sport. Students at Clarkson had organized a team before the war but it was not officially recognized by the school. Their continued efforts, however, led the college to sign off on the 'minor' program  for the 20–21 scholastic year. Gordon Croskery is listed by Clarkson as being the team's head coach this season, however, according to their records, Croskery was still attending MIT and wouldn't graduate until the spring of 1922. For their ice rink, the team was forced to wait for the weather to grow cold enough to freeze the water in and around Ives Park, a wooded area on the shore of Norwood Lake. This would serve as the team's home for the first 18 years of its existence.

On the ice, sophomore Bill Johnson was the team's captain and, by all accounts, its best player. In the program's first game, they played an amateur club from Alexandria Bay. Johnson scored all 6 of the Knights' goals in their 6–4 win. Four days later the team was in Clinton for its first intercollegiate match, facing off against Hamilton College. Their second game didn't go nearly as smoothly and Clarkson lost 1–6. Their final game of the season served as not only the team's first ever home game, but also as a rematch with Alexandria Bay. The two produced a near replica of the first match with Clarkson winning 5–4. 

While its first season lasted just over a week, the team could take pride in being able to produce a winning record, albeit against relatively weak competition.

Roster

Standings

Schedule and Results

|-
!colspan=12 style=";" | Regular Season

References

Clarkson Golden Knights men's ice hockey seasons
Clarkson
Clarkson
Clarkson
Clarkson